Denis Halilović (born 2 March 1986) is a former Slovenian footballer who played as a centre-back.

References

External links

NZS profile 

1986 births
Living people
Sportspeople from Slovenj Gradec
Slovenian people of Bosnia and Herzegovina descent
Slovenian footballers
Slovenia youth international footballers
Slovenia under-21 international footballers
Association football defenders
NK Rudar Velenje players
NK Celje players
NK Drava Ptuj players
FC Saturn Ramenskoye players
Willem II (football club) players
PFC CSKA Sofia players
NK Domžale players
FC Koper players
Yokohama FC players
SK Austria Klagenfurt players
NK Fužinar players
NK Šmartno 1928 players
Slovenian Second League players
Slovenian PrvaLiga players
Russian Premier League players
Eredivisie players
First Professional Football League (Bulgaria) players
J2 League players
Slovenian expatriate footballers
Slovenian expatriate sportspeople in Russia
Expatriate footballers in Russia
Slovenian expatriate sportspeople in the Netherlands
Expatriate footballers in the Netherlands
Slovenian expatriate sportspeople in Bulgaria
Expatriate footballers in Bulgaria
Slovenian expatriate sportspeople in Japan
Expatriate footballers in Japan
Slovenian expatriate sportspeople in Austria
Expatriate footballers in Austria